Cecil Aubrey Coghlan (1878 – 26 August 1924) was an Australian politician.

He was born in Redfern to builder Thomas Coghlan and Dora Jordan. He attended Sydney Grammar School and was then a solicitor's clerk, working for John McLaughlin. He was admitted as a solicitor in 1900 and eventually ran a substantial industrial practice. He married Ellen Grant around 1903; they had three children. In 1921 he was appointed to the New South Wales Legislative Council as a Labor member, serving until his death at Darling Point in 1924. He was the brother of Sir Timothy Coghlan, government statistician and Agent-General.

References

1878 births
1924 deaths
Australian Labor Party members of the Parliament of New South Wales
Members of the New South Wales Legislative Council